Salvador del Mundo was a 112-gun three-decker ship of the line built at Ferrol for the Spanish Navy in 1787 to plans by Romero Landa, one of the eight very large ships of the line of the Santa Ana class, also known as los Meregildos. Salvador del Mundo served during the French Revolutionary Wars until its capture at the Battle of Cape St Vincent by a Royal Navy fleet on 14 February 1797. Salvador del Mundo remained in British hands throughout the Napoleonic Wars, serving as a harbour ship, until it was sold and broken up in 1815.

Construction
The Santa Ana class was built for the Spanish fleet in the 1780s and 1790s as heavy ships of the line, the equivalent of Royal Navy first rate ships. The other ships of the class were the Santa Ana,  Mexicano, San Hermenegildo, Conde de Regla, Real Carlos, Reina María Luisa and Príncipe de Asturias. Three of the class, including Salvador del Mundo, were captured or destroyed during the French Revolutionary Wars.

History
In 1797 Salvador del Mundo participated in the Battle of Cape St Vincent against the Royal Navy on 14 February under Brigadier Antonio Yepes. During the battle Salvador del Mundo was dismasted and badly damaged before being captured by the British, with losses of 41 killed, including Yepes, and 124 wounded. William Prowse took command of the prize ship. Three other Spanish ships were captured during the battle.

Salvador de Mundo was taken into the Royal Navy under her own name and subsequently served throughout the remainder of the French Revolutionary Wars and the ensuing Napoleonic Wars on harbour duties. At the conclusion of the wars, when she was decommissioned and broken up.

References 
 This article is based on a translation of an article from the Spanish Wikipedia.

External links
 

1787 ships
Ships of the line of the Spanish Navy
Ships of the line of the Royal Navy